Rustrela virus, scientific name Rubivirus strelense, is a species of virus in the genus Rubivirus.

History  
Scientists discovered Rustrela in acutely encephalitic placental and marsupial mammals – a donkey, a capybara, and a wallaby – in a zoo in Germany, and in wild yellow-necked field mice in and around the zoo. The virus can jump between species and interestingly infects both placental and marsupial animals.

Structure 
The Rustrela virus has the same genomic structure as the Rubella virus. Rustrela has a few amino acid differences in the protein which binds to host cells. There are four putative B cell epitopes in the fusion (E1) protein of rustrela that are highly conserved with Rubella virus and Ruhugu virus.

References 

Viruses